Myrteola nummularia (also known as teaberry, huarapo, ñaurapo or daudapo) is a species of plant in the Myrteola genus, which is found in the Falkland islands and southern parts of South America such as Patagonia. It is a small perennial shrub often wider than it is tall, which grows in marshy areas. It has edible berries which may be eaten fresh or used in the preparation of jams or liquors.

See also
Ugni molinae
Myrcianthes coquimbensis

References

Myrtaceae
Flora of South America